Mega-Anime is a Russian distributor of anime content from Japan. It was founded in 2005. It was founded by Megaliner Entertainment.

The company competes with MC Entertainment, fellow Russian anime distributor. The company distributes anime in full Russian dubbing. In 2007, it was announced that Mega-Anime acquired the licenses to Bleach and Death Note, which later happened 2008. The company is based in Moscow.

Licensed anime
The Cancelled indicates that the company has licensed that series but has not done any production and dropped it without releasing it.

The Expired indicates that the company has licensed that series & has released it but the rights have expired.
 Basilisk (expired)
 Burst Angel
 Black Cat
 Bleach
 Blood+
 Claymore (cancelled)
 Death Note
 Evangelion: 1.0 You Are (Not) Alone
 Fafner in the Azure (cancelled)
 Fruits Basket (cancelled)
 Fullmetal Alchemist
 Futakoi Alternative (cancelled)
 Gun Sword
 Heat Guy J
 He Is My Master
 Kurau Phantom Memory (cancelled)
 Love Hina (cancelled)
 Maria-sama ga Miteru
 Mouse
 Noein (cancelled)
 Noir
 Paradise Kiss
 RahXephon (cancelled)
 Rozen Maiden
 Stellvia (cancelled)
 Strait Jacket
 Tenjho Tenge
 Trigun
 Trinity Blood
 X

See also

 MC Entertainment
 Reanimedia

References

External links
 
 

Anime companies
Companies established in 2005
Entertainment companies of Russia
Companies based in Moscow